The Rockaway Parkway Line is a public transit line in Brooklyn, New York City, running mostly along Rockaway Parkway between Canarsie Pier and the Canarsie–Rockaway Parkway terminal of the BMT Canarsie Line of the New York City Subway. Originally a streetcar line, it is now the B42 bus route, operated by the New York City Transit Authority.

The Wilson Avenue Line (now the B60 bus) continues north on Rockaway Parkway from the end of the B42 to Williamsburg.

History
The line was originally operated as an electric streetcar by the Nassau Electric Railroad, a company that became part of the Brooklyn Rapid Transit (BRT) Company system, subsequently reorganized as the Brooklyn and Queens Transit Corporation in 1928 before passing to city ownership in 1940.

Initially cars were through-routed between Williamsburg and Canarsie Pier via the Wilson Avenue Line (then Hamburg Avenue) and Rockaway Parkway. It was later cut at the company's Canarsie Depot at the corner of Hegeman and Rockaway Avenues, running via Rockaway Avenue and Rockaway Parkway to the Canarsie Pier. At the Canarsie Line rapid transit station at Rockaway Parkway and Glenwood Road, the Rockaway Parkway Line crossed the rapid transit line's surface right-of-way. The rapid transit line then turned east on private-right-of-way to parallel the trolley line to the shore and ferry.

When the elevated train service was truncated at the Rockaway Parkway station after the 1917 summer season, the BRT operated a shuttle trolley on the former surface elevated line trackage, but did not discontinue the Rockaway Parkway Line.

Under city ownership, the trolley shuttle on the former elevated line's right-of-way was abandoned on November 21, 1942. On the same day, the terminals of the Wilson Avenue and Rockaway Parkway lines were changed from the Canarsie Depot to the Rockaway Parkway station, essentially turning the Rockaway Parkway Line into a replacement of the Canarsie Line shuttle. At the Canarsie Pier end of the line, the Rockaway Parkway trolleys were rerouted via St. Jude Place and Canarsie Road in order to access the former shuttle station at the shore.

In recognition of the fact that the Rockaway Parkway Line was replacing the survivor of a former rapid transit service, a free transfer between the Canarsie Line and the Rockaway Parkway trolley was instituted with trolleys entering the fare control of the Rockaway Parkway station. The free subway-streetcar (later subway-bus) transfer arrangement continues today, and is the only such transfer that can be made without having to use a MetroCard.

Buses designated B42 were substituted for streetcars on April 29, 1951.

On December 1, 2022, the MTA released a draft redesign of the Brooklyn bus network. As part of the redesign, the B42 would retain its route, but closely spaced stops would be eliminated. The B42 would be supplemented by the existing B60 route and the new B76 route, which would also run along Rockaway Parkway and Rockaway Avenue.

References

Streetcar lines in Brooklyn
B042
B042